Gomer was a paddle frigate of the French Navy, lead ship of her class.

She served in the Caribbean in 1843, and later served off France and England after being refitted as a royal yacht for Louis-Philippe. In August 1843, while serving in the Caribbean, the frigate crew suffered an outbreak of yellow fever, which necessitated the captain to request medical aide from the Pensacola Navy Yard hospital. The crew were under treatment from 23 August to 29 September 1843.   

In 1851, she took part in the Bombardment of Salé. During the Second French Empire, she took part in the Crimean War and in the French intervention in Mexico.

She was decommissioned in 1868 and broken up soon afterward.

Sources and references 

 Jean-Michel Roche, Dictionnaire des Bâtiments de la flotte de guerre française de Colbert à nos jours, tome I
 

Frigates of France
Ships built in France
Frigates of the French Navy
1841 ships
Second French intervention in Mexico
Crimean War naval ships of France